Clive Dawson is a screenwriter working in film and television. His credits include a number of the UK's top-rated television shows including The Bill and Casualty.  He was also the creator and sole writer of the original motion picture screenplay for the theatrical feature-film, The Bunker.

His latest project is a feature-length adaptation of Sydney J. Bounds' sci-fi short story "The Animators", directed by Oscar-nominated Ruairi Robinson and produced by Qwerty Films.

Filmography 
 The Bunker (2001, written by)
 The Last Days on Mars (2013, screenplay)

External links

British male screenwriters
British television writers
Year of birth missing (living people)
Living people
Place of birth missing (living people)
British male television writers